Copper oxide selenite is an inorganic compound with the chemical formula Cu2OSeO3. It is an electrically insulating, piezoelectric and piezomagnetic material, which becomes a ferrimagnet upon cooling below 58 K. As of 2021, Cu2OSeO3 is the only insulating material that hosts magnetic skyrmions.

Synthesis

Cu2OSeO3 polycrystals can be grown by heating a 2:1 molar mixture of CuO and SeO2 powders at 600 °C for 12 hours in vacuum. They can be converted into olive-green single crystals ca. 4 mm in size by chemical vapor transport. NH4Cl is used as the transport agent; it sublimes at 340 °C, yielding NH3 and HCl gases.

Structure
Cu2OSeO3 crystals have a cubic, distorted pyrochlore structure built by Cu4O and SeO3 units. The spins on three Cu2+ ions in each tetrahedron (Cu1 sites) are aligned, while the Cu2 spin is facing in the opposite direction, resulting in a ferrimagnetic order. The helical spin and skyrmion textures emerge at low magnetic fields due to the Dzyaloshinskii-Moriya interaction.

Properties

Cu2OSeO3 is a ferrimagnet, and all its properties below the Curie temperature strongly depend on magnetic field. With increasing field, its spin texture changes from helical stripes to conical stripes or skyrmion lattice, and then to a "field polarized", i.e., ferrimagnetic alignment. Thermal conductivity peaks around 9 K with a value of ca. 400 W/(m·K). The magnetization damping constant is 1 at 5 K. This value is only 4 times larger than that of yttrium iron garnet, which has the lowest magnetization damping value among all materials. This property is advantageous for high-frequency electronic applications, as it results in low current-induced heat.

References 

Selenites
Copper(I) compounds